The Glasgow and South Western Railway (GSWR) 956 class is a class of four 2-2-2 steam locomotives designed in 1855.

Development 
Patrick Stirling was appointed locomotive superintendent of the GSWR  in 1853 and this was his first design.  They had domed boilers and column-type safety valves above the firebox (steam engine). They were numbered 95–98.

Withdrawal 
The class was withdrawn by James Stirling during 1874–5.

References 

095
2-2-2 locomotives
Standard gauge steam locomotives of Great Britain
Railway locomotives introduced in 1855